The following is a list of notable events and releases of the year 2015 in Norwegian music.

Events

January
 21 – Bodø Jazz Open started in Bodø (January 21–24).
 23
 Nordlysfestivalen started in Tromsø (January 23 – February 1).
 Ragnar Olsen, (folk singer) was awarded the Nordlysprisen 2015 at Nordlysfestivalen.
 29 – Kristiansund Opera Festival (Operafestukene) 2015 started in Kristiansund (January 29 – February 7).

February
 5
 Ice Music Festival 2015 started in Geilo (February 5–8).
 The Polarjazz Festival 2015 starts in Longyearbyen (February 5–8).
 6 – Oslo Operaball 2015 was arranged in Oslo.

March
 4 – By:Larm 2015 started in Oslo (March 4–7).
 5 – Oslo International Church Music Festival 2015 started in Oslo (March 5–15).
 6 – Narvik Winter Festival started (March 6 – 15).
 24 – Ingrid Søfteland Neset was the winner of this years soloist competition awarded by The Royal Danish Academy of Music.
 27 – Vossajazz started in Voss (March 27–29).
 28
 Thea Hjelmeland was awarded Vossajazzprisen 2015 for the album Solar Plexus.
 Live Maria Roggen performs the commissioned work Apukaluptein at Vossajazz.

April
 1 – Inferno Metal Festival 2015 started in Oslo (April 1–4).
 23
 SoddJazz started in Inderøy, Nord-Trøndelag (April 23–26).
 Nidaros Blues Festival 2015 started in Trondheim (April 23–26).
 30
 Bergen Filharmoniske Orkester performed Symphony No. 9 (Beethoven) in Grieghallen, Bergen.
 In The Country featuring Frida Ånnevik played at Victoria – Nasjonal Jazzscene in Oslo.
 Highasakite played at Sentrum Scene in Oslo.
 Oslo Ess (with friends) played at the Brygga Kultursal in Halden.
 The D'voice Festival 2015 started in Songdalen (April 30 – May 1).
 Karmøygeddon Metal Festival 2015 started in Karmøy (April 30 – May 3).

May
 1
 Dave Holland Prism played at Victoria – Nasjonal Jazzscene in Oslo.
 Chris Thompson / Mads Eriksen Band + Elg played at Madam Felle in Bergen.
 2
 Frode Kjekstad Trio played at Herr Nilsen Concert pub in Oslo.
 Kvelertak played at Jevnakerhallen  in Jevnaker.
 5 – MaiJazz 2015 started in Stavanger (May 5 – 10).
 6 – AnJazz 2015 started in Hamar (May 6 – 9).
 7
 Julie Dahle Aagård played at Uhørt in Oslo.
 Lisa Ekdahl play at Rockefeller in Oslo.
 Bergen Big Band with Gabriel Fliflet and Ole Hamre played at Sardinen USF in Bergen.
 Trondheim Jazz Festival 2015 started in Trondheim (May 7–10).
 8
 Per Mathisen Trio played at Draaben Bar in Sandefjord.
 Hanna Paulsberg Concept / Soil Collectors / MOPO played at Victoria – Nasjonal Jazzscene Oslo.
 9 – Iver Kleive played Requiem in Røros Church.
 10 – Kampenjazz: Anja Eline Skybakmoen played at Cafeteatret Oslo.
 15
 Jan Erik Mikalsen won the International Rostrum of Composers in the general category for the composition Songs for Orchestra.
 Per Mathisen Trio played at Victoria – National Jazz Scene in Oslo.
 16 – Farmers Market played at Victoria – National Jazz Scene in Oslo.
 22 – Eivind Opsvik Overseas played at Victoria – National Jazz Scene in Oslo.
 23 – Beady Belle played at Victoria – National Jazz Scene in Oslo.
 27 – Festspillene i Bergen 2015 started (May 27 – June 10).
 28
 Nattjazz started in Bergen (May 28 – June 6).
 Bergen Big Band was the very first recipients of Olav Dale's Memorial Award at the opening of Nattjazz 2015.

June
 10
 Norwegian Wood 2015 started in Oslo, Norway (June 10–13).
 Opera Østfold 2015 started in Halden (June 10–13).
 11 – Bergenfest 2015 started in Bergen, Norway (June 11 – 14).
 15 – Grieg in Bergen 2015 started in Bergen, Norway (June 15 – August 22).
 21 – Hardanger Music Festival 2015 started in Ullensvang (June 21 – 25).
 23 – Risør Festival of Chamber Music 2015 started in Risør (June 23–28).

July
 1
 Kongsberg Jazzfestival 2015 started in Kongsberg (July 1–4).
 Ellen Andrea Wang was recipient of the Kongsberg Jazz Award or DNB.prisen 2015 at the Kongsberg Jazzfestival.
 Vinstra Music Festival 2015 started in Vinstra (July 1 – 5).
 Førde International Folk Music Festival 2015 started in Førde (July 1 – 5).
 2 – Stavernfestivalen 2015 started in Stavern (July 2–4).
 8 – Riddu Riđđu 2015 started in Kåfjord, Troms (July 8–12).
 13 – Moldejazz 2015 started in Molde with Mats Gustafsson as artist in residence (July 13–18).
 16
 Jan Ole Otnæs received the 2015 Molderosen at Moldejazz.
 Bukta Festival 2015 started in Tromsø (July 16–18).
 The Malakoff 2015 started in Nordfjordeid (July 16–18).
 The Slottsfjell Festival 2015 started in Tønsberg (July 16–18).
 Vinjerock 2015 started in Eidsbugarden, Jotunheimen (July 16–19).
 22
 Canal Street 2015 started in Arendal (July 22–25).
 Seljord Country Festival 2015 started in Seljord (July 22 – 26).
 28 – Olavsfestdagene 2015 started in Trondheim (July 28 – August 2).
 30
 Raumarock 2015 started in Åndalsnes (July 30 – August 1).
 Notodden Blues Festival 2015 started in Notodden (July 30 – August 2).

August
 5
 Sildajazz 2015 started in Haugesund (August 5–9).
 Varanger Festival 2015 started in Vadsø (August 5–9). Arcane Station will have his debut concert here.
 6 
 Telemark Festival 2015 started in Bø i Telemark (August 6–9).
 Hemnesjazz 2015 started in Hemnesberget, Helgeland (August 6–9).
 8 – The Kids in Jazz 2015 festival started in Oslo as part of the Oslo Jazzfestival (August 8–12).
 10 – Oslo Jazzfestival started in Oslo (August 10–15).
 11 – Øyafestivalen started in Oslo (August 11–15).
 12 – Anneli Drecker played at Øyafestivalen.
 15 – Oslo Chamber Music Festival 2015 started in Oslo (July 15–23).
 21 – Pstereo Festival 2015 started in Trondheim (July 21–22).

September
 3 – Punktfestivalen 2015 started in Kristiansand (September 3–5).
 10 – Ultima Oslo Contemporary Music Festival 2015 started in Oslo (September 10–19).
 20 – Trondheim Chamber Music Festival 2015 started in Trondheim (July 20–27).

October
15 – DølaJazz 2015 started in Lillehammer (October 15–18).
 22 – The Insomnia Festival started in Tromsø (October 22–25).
 28 – The Ekkofestival started in Bergen (October 28 – November 1).

November
 11 – The Vardø Blues Festival (Blues i Vintermørket) started (November 11 – 15).
 25 – The 10th Barents Jazz, Tromsø International Jazz Festival started (November 25 – 29).

December
 11 – The Nobel Peace Prize Concert was held at Telenor Arena.
 15 – 2015 Southern Norwegian jazz center award received by Hilde Hefte.
 29 – RIBBEjazz 2015 – a one-day festival in Lillestrøm.

Albums released

January

February

March

April

May

June

July

August

September

October

November

December

Unknown date
#

K – Tenor Battle by Håkon Kornstad (Jazzland Recordings)

New Artists
 AURORA with her debut album Running with the Wolves (Decca Records), awarded Spellemannprisen in the category This year's newcomer and Gramo scholarship.

Deaths

February
 22 – Erik Amundsen, jazz bassist (born 1937).

 May
 20 – Simon Flem Devold, jazz clarinetist and columnist (born 1929).
 23 – Liv Marit Wedvik, country singer (born 1970).

July 
 14 – Gerd Gudding, traditional folk musician and entertainer (born 1951).

August 
 12 – Per Hjort Albertsen, contemporary classical composer (born 1919).
 30 – Natalia Strelchenko, Russian born Norwegian classical concert pianist (born 1976).

November
 5 – Nora Brockstedt, jazz and pop music singer (born 1923).
 20 – Ketil Vea, contemporary classical composer and music teacher (born 1932).
 25 – Svein Christiansen, jazz drummer (born 1941).

 December
 16 – Jostein Eriksen, opera singer (born 1926).
 26 – Tore Andersen, country musician (born 1960).

Seed also
 Music of Norway
 2015 in Norway
 Norway in the Eurovision Song Contest 2015
 Spellemannprisen
 Buddyprisen
 Nordlysprisen
 Edvard Grieg Memorial Award
 Thorgeir Stubø Memorial Award
 Rolf Gammleng Memorial Award
 Radka Toneff Memorial Award

References

 
Norwegian music
Norwegian
Music
2010s in Norwegian music